Peter Luczak and Alessandro Motti were the defending champions, but Luczak chose not to compete this year and Motti chose to compete in Biella instead.
Andre Begemann and Matthew Ebden won in the final 7–6(5), 5–7, [10–3] against Rubén Ramírez Hidalgo and Santiago Ventura.

Seeds

Draw

Draw

External Links
 Doubles Draw

Zagreb Open - Doubles
Zagreb Open